Novoselov (masculine) or Novoselova (feminine) is a Russian surname. Notable people with the surname include:

 Andrei Novoselov (born 1989), Russian pair skater
 Evgenii Novoselov (born 1989), Russian diver
 Konstantin Novoselov (born 1974), Russian-British physicist
 Masha Novoselova (born 1985), Russian fashion model
 Vadim Novoselov (born 1987), Russian badminton player

See also
 

Russian-language surnames